Andrew B. Williams is an American academic in the field of engineering. He is currently the Dean of Engineering and the Louis S. LeTellier Chair for The Citadel School of Engineering in Charleston. It comes with a rank of Colonel in the SCM. He was the Associate Dean for Diversity, Equity, and Inclusion at the University of Kansas, and the Charles E. and Mary Jane Spahr Professor in Electrical Engineering and Computer Science.

Education 
Williams graduated from the University of Kansas in 1988 with a B.S. degree in electrical engineering. He then attended Marquette University and earned an M.S. degree in Electrical & Computer Engineering in 1995 before returning to the University of Kansas and graduating with a Ph.D. degree in electrical engineering in 1999. His thesis was on learning ontologies in multi-agent systems. He was the first African American to graduate from the University of Kansas with a Ph.D. degree in electrical engineering.

Career and research 
In 1999, Williams was appointed as an assistant professor in the electrical and computer engineering department at the University of Iowa where he started RAMP-IT, a computer and robotics day camp for underrepresented students. In 2004, Williams served as Department Chair in Computer and Information Sciences at Spelman College in Atlanta, GA and as a Research Affiliate at Georgia Institute of Technology in the Human-Automation Systems Lab. In 2012, Williams joined Marquette University as a Professor and the John P. Raynor, S.J., Distinguished Chair of Electrical & Computer Engineering. There he directed the Humanoid Engineering & Intelligent Robotics (HEIR) Lab. Williams's research is in humanoid robotics and AI, intelligent humanoid coaches, and cooperative autonomous systems.

Williams was the first Senior Engineering Diversity Manager at Apple Inc. under Steve Jobs. He was named a National Science Foundation ScienceMaker for his national efforts to increase STEM diversity. While at Spelman College, he founded and directed the SpelBots, an internationally known all-female RoboCup robotics team. He also authored the book Out of the Box: Building Robots, Transforming Lives.

Selected publications 

 “Learning to Share Meaning in a Multi-Agent System,” J. of Autonomous Agents and Multi-Agent Systems, vol. 8, no. 2, 165–193, 2004.
 Out of the Box: Building Robots, Transforming Lives (with E. Gilbreath), Moody Publishers and Institute for Black Family Development, Chicago, 2009.
 “The Potential Social Impact of the Artificial Intelligence Divide,” Ethics, Safety, and Trust in Intelligent Agents, AAAI 2018 Spring Symposium, Stanford, CA, March 2018.

Awards and honors 

 National Science Foundation ScienceMaker
 Mike and Joyce Shinn Innovator and Leader Award, KU Black Alumni Network
 Selected as TEDx UW-Milwaukee speaker
 Marquette University Tribee Award, HEIR Lab, Student Chapter of the Year
 20 Most Creative Milwaukeeans, Milwaukee Magazine, November 2013
 NPR’s Tell Me More Black Tech Game Changers
 IEEE Computer Society Distinguished Speaker
 National Academy of Engineering Frontiers in Engineering Participant
 GEM Consortium Alumni Mentoring Award
 Marquette University Young Engineering Alumni Award

References

External links 
Andrew B Williams publications indexed by Google Scholar

Year of birth missing (living people)
Living people
American electrical engineers
University of Kansas alumni
Marquette University alumni
University of Kansas faculty
African-American academics
21st-century African-American people